Myron was Athenian sculptor from the mid-5th century BC.

Myron may also refer to:

People

Myron (given name), a masculine given name
Saint Myron, archbishop of Crete, ~250-350

Arts and entertainment

 Myron (duo), Swiss music band with Manu-L as vocalist
 Myron (novel), a novel by Gore Vidal
 Myron, a plasticine character created by Shaun Micallef
 "Myron (song)", a single released by Lil Uzi Vert in 2020
 Myron Mako, the main protagonist of the 2008 strategy game Robocalypse

Others
 4752 Myron, a main-belt asteroid
 Myron (crater), a crater on Mercury
 Mýron or míron, a particularly holy chrism used for anointing in the Eastern Orthodox churches
 Darapsa myron, a moth of the family Sphingidae
 SS Myron, a steamboat built in 1888
 Myron (snake), a genus of snakes